Presidency University may refer to:

 Presidency University, Kolkata
 Presidency University, Bangalore
 Presidency University, Bangladesh

See also
 Presidency College (disambiguation)